Barking College may refer to:
Barking and Dagenham College, a current further education college
Barking Regional College of Technology, a predecessor to the present University of East London